Tosh Samkange (born March 15, 1997) is an American soccer player.

Career
On February 10, 2015, it was announced that Samkange signed a letter of intent to play college soccer at the University of Denver.  On May 20, he made his professional debut for Seattle Sounders FC 2 in a U.S. Open Cup match against PDL side Kitsap Pumas.  S2 won the match 4–2 in extra time.  He made his second Open Cup appearance a week later in a 2–1 victory over Portland Timbers 2 in extra time.

Despite the fact that he appeared for S2, Samkange was able to maintain his college eligibility and made his collegiate debut for Denver on August 29 in a 4–0 victory over Cal State Bakersfield.

References

External links
Denver Pioneers bio
USSF Development Academy bio

1997 births
Living people
American soccer players
Denver Pioneers men's soccer players
Tacoma Defiance players
Association football defenders
Soccer players from Washington (state)
USL Championship players
USL League Two players
People from Sammamish, Washington
Sportspeople from King County, Washington